Vulcaniella klimeschi is a moth of the family Cosmopterigidae. It can be found in Macedonia, mainland Greece and Crete.

The wingspan of this type of moth is 7–9 mm. Adults have been recorded in the beginning of June.

The larvae feed on Salvia ringens. They mine the leaves of their host plant. The mine consists of a full depth corridor along the midrib, continued in a blotch. The inside of the mine is covered with silk, and contains no frass. The larva constructs a silken case at the beginning of the mine. The case is covered with frass.

External links
bladmineerders.nl
Fauna Europaea

Vulcaniella
Moths of Europe
Moths described in 1966